RIC-3 also known as resistance to inhibitors of cholinesterase 3 is a chaperone protein that in humans is encoded by the RIC3 gene. The RIC3 gene was first discovered in C. elegans.  RIC-3 protein is conserved in most animals and influences the maturation of various ligand gated ion channels including the serotonin 5-HT3 receptor and nicotinic acetylcholine receptors, particularly the homomeric α7 nicotinic receptor.   RIC-3 enhances currents generated by these receptors by expediting receptor transport to the cell surface and by increasing receptor number.

References

Further reading